Heat is a 1963 Soviet drama film directed by Larisa Shepitko.

Plot 
The film tells about a man named Kemal, who goes to Anarkhai (Анархай) to master the virgin lands, becomes a member of the brigade of authoritarian Abakir and, by virtue of his maximalism, violates the order organized there.

Production 
The film is the debut feature of acclaimed Soviet director Larisa Shepitko. Temperatures reached up to 120 degrees Fahrenheit while filming, causing the film stock to melt at certain points. Shepitko came down with jaundice during production, but insisted she keep working. She was carried around on a stretcher at certain points during production so that she could continue working.

Cast 
 Bolotbek Shamshiyev as Kemel (as B. Shamshiyev)
 Nurmukhan Zhanturin as Abakir (as N. Zhanturin)
 Klara Yusupzhanova as Kalipa (as K. Yusupzhanova)
 Kumbolot Dosumbayev as Sheyshen (as K. Dosumbayev)
 Darkul Kuyukova as Aldey (as D. Kuyakova)
 K. Esyenov as Sadabek
 Roza Tabaldiyeva as Girl (as R. Tabaldiyeva)
 Sadykbek Dzhamanov as Dzhumash (as S. Dzhamanov)

References

External links 
 

1963 films
1960s Russian-language films
Soviet drama films
1963 drama films